The 2010 Hong Kong Cricket Sixes officially known as Karp Group & PC Jeweller Hong Kong Cricket Sixes was the sixteenth edition of the tournament, taking place at Kowloon Cricket Club, Hong Kong. Eight teams competed in the tournament which lasted over two days, 6 – 7 November 2010. The tournament also featured China for the first time playing an exhibition match with a Hong Kong development team. The tournament was won by Australia who defeated Pakistan in the final.

Squads

Sir Donald Bradman Group

Hong Kong
  Najeeb Amar (Mainlanders) Captain
  Hussain Butt (Hong Kong University) Wicketkeeper
  Irfan Ahmed (Little Sai Wan Warriors/JKN Little Sai Wan)
  Munir Dar (Little Sai Wan Warriors/JKN Little Sai Wan)
  Tanvir Afzal (Hong Kong University)
  Peter Wooden (Kowloon Cricket Club Saracens)
  Aizaz Khan (Pakistan Association)
  Charlie Burke Coach

England
  Rory Hamilton-Brown (Surrey) Captain
  Darren Stevens (Kent)
  Peter Trego (Somerset)
  Rikki Clarke (Warwickshire)
  Jos Buttler (Somerset) Wicketkeeper
  Chris Nash (Sussex)
  Steven Croft (Lancashire)
  James Whitaker Manager

Australia
  Daniel Christian (South Australia Redbacks)
  Tom Cooper (South Australia Redbacks)
  Tim Armstrong (New South Wales Blues)
  Matthew Johnston (Western Australia Warriors)
  Glenn Maxwell (Victoria Bushrangers)
  Will Sheridan (Victoria Bushrangers)
  Ryan Carters (Victoria Bushrangers)
  David Warner (New South Wales Blues)
  John Davison Manager

South Africa
  Shane Burger Captain
  David Wiese
  Adrian McLaren
  Shaheen Khan
  Andrew Birch
  Keshav Maharaj
  Godfrey Stevens
  Lawrence Mahatlane Manager

Sir Garfield Sobers Group
To be announced

India
  Anil Kumble (Bangalore Royal Challengers) Captain
  Rohan Gavaskar (Kolkata Knight Riders)
  Stuart Binny (Mumbai Indians)
  Bharat Chipli (Bangalore Royal Challengers)
  Balachandra Akhil (Bangalore Royal Challengers)
  Reetinder Singh Sodhi (Kings XI Punjab)
  Sridharan Sriram (Bangalore Royal Challengers)

Sri Lanka
  Jeevantha Kulatunga (Wayamba Elevens) Captain
  Indika de Saram Wicketkeeper
  Kaushalya Weeraratne
  Dilhara Lokuhettige
  Chintaka Jayasinghe
  Dilruwan Perera 
  Kosala Kulasekera

Pakistan
  Shoaib Malik  Captain
  Imran Nazir 
  Shoaib Khan  
  Ahmed Shehzad 
  Asad Ali     
  Sohail Khan

New Zealand
   Scott Styris (C)
   Daryl Tuffey
   Nathan McCullum
   Carl Frauenstein
   Logan van Beek
   Harry Boam
   Kieran Noema-Barnett

Exhibition Match

Hong Kong Development
  John Patrick Roy Lamsam (Kowloon Cricket Club Crusaders/Kowloon Cricket Club Templars) Captain
  Jason Lui (Centaurs Cricket Club/Hong Kong Cricket Club Optimists) Wicketkeeper
  Siegfried Wai Hon Hei (Mainlanders)
  Li Kai Ming (Mainlanders)
  Bobby Chan Ka Ming (Mainlanders)
  Nizakat Khan (Little Sai Wan Warriors/JKN Little Sai Wan)
  Asif Khan (Little Sai Wan Warriors/JKN Little Sai Wan)
  Jawaid Iqbal Coach

China
  Wang Lei Captain
  
  
  
  
  
  
  Rashid Khan Coach

References

External links
 Hong Kong Cricket Sixes 2010 – Home Page
Cricinfo

Hong Kong Cricket Sixes
Hong Kong Cricket Sixes
Hong Kong Cricket Sixes